Prince or King of Dai was an ancient and medieval Chinese title.

King of Dai is sometimes used to describe the heads of the Baidi state of Dai north of the Zhou Kingdom that was conquered by the Zhao clan of Jin. It was used as the title for the Zhao successor state headed by Zhao Jia, and for one of the Eighteen Kingdoms established by Xiang Yu after the fall of Qin.

The title King or Prince of Dai was subsequently used as an appanage of imperial Chinese dynasties, in reference to the Commandery of Dai that existed from the state of Zhao until the Sui. It was also sometimes used to describe rebellious or independent kingdoms in the same area.

Title holders

Warring States

 Zhao Jia

Eighteen Kingdoms

Han dynasty

 Liu Xi or Zhong (r. 201–200 BC), elder brother of Liu Bang (posthumously "Emperor Gaozu"), demoted for cowardice
 Liu Ruyi (200–198 BC), son of Liu Bang by the concubine Qi, translated to Zhao
 Chen Xi (197–194 BC), rebel
 Liu Heng (196–180 BC), son of Liu Bang by the consort Bo, promoted to emperor (posthumously "Emperor Wen")
 Liu Wu, (178 BC – 176 BC) second son of Liu Heng
 Liu Can (176 BC – 162 BC), third son of Liu Heng
 Liu Deng (162 BC – 133 BC), son of Liu Can, grandson of Emperor Wen of Han
 Liu Lang (133 BC – 114 BC), great grandson of Emperor Wen of Han, last Prince of Dai in Han dynasty

Sixteen Kingdoms

Tuoba Yilu (died 316), chieftain of the Tuoba tribe appointed Duke of Dai, then Prince of Dai by Western Jin
Tuoba Pugen (died 316), son of Tuoba Yilu
Tuoba Yulü (died 321), killed in a coup d'état by Tuoba Heru
Tuoba Heru (died 325), succeed after coup, son of Tuoba Yituo
Tuoba Yihuai (died 338, 337–338), son of Tuoba Yulü
Tuoba Shiyijian (320–376), younger brother of Tuoba Yihuai, last Prince of Dai, and grandfather of Emperor Daowu of Northern Wei

See also
 Dai (disambiguation)
 Prince of Wu

External links
 《代国》 at Baike.com 

 
Dai
Chinese royal titles